Elena Dementieva was the defending champion, but did not compete this year.

Svetlana Kuznetsova won the title by defeating Marlene Weingärtner 6–1, 6–4 in the final.

Seeds
The top two seeds received a bye into the second round.

Draw

Finals

Top half

Bottom half

References

External links
 Official results archive (ITF)
 Official results archive (WTA)

2004 WTA Tour
Commonwealth Bank Tennis Classic
Sport in Indonesia